Samuel Lehtonen (3 February 1921, Helsinki – 20 August 2010) was the Lutheran bishop of the Diocese of Helsinki of the Evangelical Lutheran Church of Finland from 1982 to 1991.

References

1921 births
2010 deaths
Lutheran bishops of Helsinki